Baldwin is a station on the Babylon Branch of the Long Island Rail Road. It is officially located on Sunrise Highway and Grand Avenue in Baldwin, New York, although it also includes Milburn and Brooklyn Avenues.

History
Baldwin station was originally built in February 1868 by the South Side Railroad of Long Island, though trains had already been stopping there, then called Baldwinsville, since October 28, 1867. The station was remodeled in May 1881, and was razed in 1917, and a second station was opened on December 28, later that year. As part of the grade elimination project taking place along the Babylon Branch throughout the Babylon-Montauk Branch between the 1940s and 1960s this station was razed in November 1957, and officially replaced with the current elevated structure on October 2, 1957 after the last ground level train passed through at 12:18 pm.

The Baldwin Civic Association commissioned a mural of Nunley's carousel by artist Michael White, which was installed at the Baldwin station on April 22, 2019.

Station layout
The station has one 12-car-long high-level island platform between the two tracks. The platform includes an extension over the Grand Avenue bridge between the two tracks that is covered with a gabled roof.

References

External links 

Baldwin Station Photo; April 2007 (Unofficial LIRR History Website)
 Grand Avenue entrance from Google Maps Street View
 Station House from Google Maps Street View

Long Island Rail Road stations in Nassau County, New York
Railway stations in the United States opened in 1868